The 1989-90 Argentine Primera División was the 99th season of top-flight football in Argentina. The season ran from 13 August 1989 to 22 May 1990.

This tournament introduced was the last played under the double round-robin system. Since the following season, the "Apertura and Clausura format would be introduced, crowning two different champions within a year.

River Plate won the championship (22nd league title) while Instituto (C)Racing (C) were relegated. Boca Juniors won the Liguilla pre-Libertadores after beating Independiente, therefore qualifying to the 1991 edition.

League table

Top scorers

Liguilla Pre-Libertadores

Boca Juniors qualify for the 1991 Copa Libertadores

Relegation

Relegation playoff

See also
1989–90 in Argentine football

References

Argentine Primera División seasons
1989–90 in Argentine football
Argentine
Argentine